In Greek mythology, Eurybia (meaning "wide-force"), described as "[having] a heart of flint within her", was the daughter of Pontus and Gaia, consort to the Titan Crius, and mother of Astraeus, Perses, and Pallas.  She was known as the goddess of mastery of the seas, or power over them—particularly external factors like the winds or rising of the constellations. An older, relatively minor deity, her role in most mythology is as the ancestor of other gods, and she often plays no role in the mythology.

Family tree

Notes

References 
 Apollodorus, Apollodorus, The Library, with an English Translation by Sir James George Frazer, F.B.A., F.R.S. in 2 Volumes. Cambridge, Massachusetts, Harvard University Press; London, William Heinemann Ltd. 1921.  Online version at the Perseus Digital Library.
 Hesiod, Theogony, in The Homeric Hymns and Homerica with an English Translation by Hugh G. Evelyn-White, Cambridge, Massachusetts., Harvard University Press; London, William Heinemann Ltd. 1914. Online version at the Perseus Digital Library.

External links 
 EURYBIA from The Theoi Project

Greek sea goddesses
Children of Gaia
Sea and river goddesses